Thornton School District 154, also referred to as Cook County School District 154, is an elementary school district based in the village of Thornton, Cook County, Illinois, and is a suburb of Chicago located south of the city proper. The district is composed of a single school, which covers grades one through eight in addition to kindergarten and prekindergarten programs. The institution is called Wolcott School. Thornton School District's superintendent is Dr. Carol Kunst.

External links

References

School districts in Cook County, Illinois